Liliia Ferkhatovna Nizamova (Russian: Лилия Ферхатовна Низамова, born 21 May 1991) is a Russian competitor in synchronized swimming.

She won a gold medal at the 2015 World Aquatics Championships.

References
FINA Profile

Living people
Russian synchronized swimmers
1991 births
World Aquatics Championships medalists in synchronised swimming
People from Naberezhnye Chelny
Synchronized swimmers at the 2015 World Aquatics Championships
European Aquatics Championships medalists in synchronised swimming
Sportspeople from Tatarstan